Bryan Clifford Sykes (9 September 1947 – 10 December 2020) was a British geneticist and science writer who was a Fellow of Wolfson College and Emeritus Professor of human genetics at the University of Oxford.

Sykes published the first report on retrieving DNA from ancient bone (Nature, 1989). He was involved in a number of high-profile cases dealing with ancient DNA, including that of Ötzi the Iceman. He also suggested a Florida accountant by the name of Tom Robinson was a direct descendant of Genghis Khan, a claim that was subsequently disproved.

Sykes is best known outside the community of geneticists for his two popular books on the investigation of human history and prehistory through studies of mitochondrial DNA.

Education 

Sykes was educated at Eltham College, received his BSc from the University of Liverpool, his PhD from the University of Bristol, and his DSc from the University of Oxford.

Career

The Seven Daughters of Eve 
In 2001 (Banta Press Hardback) Sykes published a book for the popular audience, The Seven Daughters of Eve, in which he explained how the dynamics of maternal mitochondrial DNA (mtDNA) inheritance leave their mark on the human population in the form of genetic clans sharing common maternal descent.  He notes that the majority of Europeans can be classified in seven such clans, known scientifically as haplogroups, distinguishable by differences in their mtDNA that are unique to each group, with each clan descending from a separate prehistoric female-line ancestor.  He referred to these seven 'clan mothers' as 'daughters of Eve', a reference to the mitochondrial Eve to whom the mtDNA of all modern humans traces.  Based on the geographical and ethnological distribution of the modern descendants of each clan he assigned provisional homelands for the seven clan mothers, and used the degree to which each clan diverges to approximate the time period when the clan mother would have lived.  He then uses these deductions to give 'biographies' for each of the clan mothers, assigning them arbitrary names based on the scientific designation of their haplogroup (for example, using the name Xenia for the founder of haplogroup X).

Blood of the Isles 
In his 2006 book Blood of the Isles (published in the United States and Canada as Saxons, Vikings and Celts: The Genetic Roots of Britain and Ireland), Sykes examines British genetic "clans". He presents evidence from mitochondrial DNA, inherited by both sexes from their mothers, and the Y chromosome, inherited by men from their fathers, and makes the following claims:

 The genetic makeup of Britain and Ireland is overwhelmingly what it has been since the Neolithic period and to a very considerable extent since the Mesolithic period, especially in the female line, i.e. those people, who in time would become identified as British Celts (culturally speaking), but who (genetically speaking) should more properly be called Cro-Magnon. In continental Europe, this same Cro-Magnon genetic legacy gave rise to the Basques. "Basque" and "Celt" are cultural designations, not genetic ones.
 The contribution of the Celts of Central Europe to the genetic makeup of Britain and Ireland was minimal; most of the genetic contribution to the British Isles of those we think of as Celtic, came from western continental Europe, i.e. the Atlantic seaboard.
 The Picts were not a separate people: the genetic makeup of the formerly Pictish areas of Scotland shows no significant differences from the general profile of the rest of Britain. The two "Pictland" regions are Tayside and Grampian.
 The Anglo-Saxons are supposed, by some, to have made a substantial contribution to the genetic makeup of England, but in Sykes's opinion it was under 20 percent of the total, even in Southern England.
 The Vikings (Danes and Norwegians) also made a substantial contribution, which is concentrated in central, northern and eastern England – the territories of the ancient Danelaw. There is a very heavy Viking contribution in the Orkney and Shetland Islands, in the vicinity of 40 percent. Women as well as men contributed substantially in all these areas, showing that the Vikings engaged in large-scale settlement.
 The Norman contribution was extremely small, on the order of 2 percent.
 There are only sparse traces of the Roman occupation, almost all in Southern England.
 In spite of all these later contributions, the genetic makeup of the British Isles remains overwhelmingly what it was in the Neolithic: a mixture of the first Mesolithic inhabitants with Neolithic settlers who came by sea from Iberia and ultimately from the eastern Mediterranean.
 There is a difference between the genetic histories of men and women in Britain and Ireland. The matrilineages show a mixture of original Mesolithic inhabitants and later Neolithic arrivals from Iberia, whereas the patrilineages are much more strongly correlated with Iberia.
 There is evidence for a "Genghis Khan effect", whereby some male lineages in ancient times were much more successful than others in leaving large numbers of descendants; e.g. Niall of the Nine Hostages in 4th and 5th century Ireland and Somerled in 12th century Scotland.

Sykes used a similar approach to that used in The Seven Daughters of Eve to identify the nine "clan mothers" of Japanese ancestry, "all different from the seven European equivalents."

Modern evidence  

With the advent of whole-genome sequencing and analysis of ancient DNA, many of Sykes' theories regarding the origins of the British have been largely invalidated. A 2018 study argues that over 90% of the DNA of the Neolithic population of Britain was overturned by a North European Bell Beaker population, originating from the Pontic Steppes, as part of an ongoing migration process that brought large amounts of Steppe DNA (including the R1b haplogroup) to North and West Europe. Modern autosomal genetic clustering is testament to this fact, as both modern and Iron Age British and Irish samples cluster genetically very closely with other North European populations, rather than Iberians, Galicians, Basques or those from the south of France. Similar studies have concluded that the Anglo-Saxons, while not replacing the previous populations outright, may have contributed more to the gene pool in much of England than Sykes had claimed.

Alleged hominid samples 
Sykes and his team at Oxford University carried out DNA analysis of presumed Yeti samples and thinks the samples may have come from a hybrid species of bear produced from a mating between a brown bear and a polar bear. Sykes told BBC News:

He conducted another similar survey in 2014, this time examining samples attributed not just to yeti but also to Bigfoot and other "anomalous primates." The study concluded that two of the 30 samples tested most closely resembled the genome of a palaeolithic polar bear, and that the other 28 were from living mammals.

The samples were subsequently re-analysed by Ceiridwen Edwards and Ross Barnett. They concluded that the mutation that had led to the match with a polar bear was a damaged artefact, and suggested that the two hair samples were in fact from Himalayan brown bears (U. arctos isabellinus). These bears are known in Nepal as Dzu-the (a Nepalese term meaning cattle-bear), and have been associated with the myth of the yeti. Sykes and Melton acknowledged that their GenBank search was in error  but suggested that the hairs were instead a match to a modern polar bear specimen "from the Diomede Islands in the Bering Sea reported in the same paper". They maintained that they did not see any sign of damage in their sequences and commented that they had "no reason to doubt the accuracy of these two sequences any more than the other 28 presented in the paper". Multiple further analyses, including replication of the single analysis conducted by Sykes and his team, were carried out in a study conducted by Eliécer E. Gutiérrez, a researcher at the Smithsonian Institution and Ronald H. Pine, affiliated at the University of Kansas. All of these analyses found that the relevant genetic variation in brown bears makes it impossible to assign, with certainty, the Himalayan samples to either that species or to the polar bear.  Because brown bears occur in the Himalayas, Gutiérrez and Pine stated that there is no reason to believe that the samples in question came from anything other than ordinary Himalayan brown bears.

Personal life
Sykes died on 10 December 2020.

Selected works 
 
  (see The Seven Daughters of Eve)
  (see Adam's Curse)

Notes

External links 
 We're nearly all Celts under the skin, by Ian Johnston, The Scotsman.
 Celts descended from Spanish fishermen, study finds, The Independent, 20 September 2006.
 Oxford Ancestors website * Curiosity drives the gene genie to a £1m turnover, Telegraph, 15 February 2008

1947 births
2020 deaths
Recent African origin of modern humans
English geneticists
Genetic genealogists
English science writers
Fellows of Wolfson College, Oxford
People educated at Eltham College
English croquet players